The Republic of China (ROC) competes as Chinese Taipei at the Paralympic Games. The ROC first participated at the Summer Paralympic Games in 1992 and has competed in every summer games since then. The nation has never participated in the Winter Paralympic Games. Chinese Taipei has a special Paralympic flag which it uses during the games.

Medals

Medals by Summer Games

Medals by Winter Games

Medals by Summer Sport

Medals by Winter Sport

Medalists

See also 
 Chinese Taipei at the Olympics

References